Tom Clancy's Ghost Recon: Jungle Storm is an expansion of Tom Clancy's Ghost Recon released for the PlayStation 2 and Nokia N-Gage. It contains the content of Tom Clancy's Ghost Recon: Island Thunder along with eight new single-player missions set in Colombia and additional multiplayer maps.

Taking place just after Tom Clancy's Ghost Recon: Island Thunder, the Tom Clancy's Ghost Recon: Jungle Storm campaign is set in Bogotá, Colombia and was written by Richard Dansky.

Plot
The drug cartel that had aided and financed the FDG in their efforts in Cuba, the FARC, has initiated a number of terrorist attacks against the Colombian government who has allied themselves with the United States. After Colombia's call for help following an attack on a US embassy, the US responds by deploying the Ghosts to restore order and put the cartel out of business.

Once deployed, the Ghosts mobilize to face off with a newly formed militia group called the MFLC (Movimiento de las Fuerzas Libres Colombianas), which is basically the southern equivalent of the FARC.

The chaos caused by the MFLC is spreading into Ecuador and Peru, making the peacekeeping effort especially vital. Throughout the campaign, the Ghosts hunt down several of the MFLC's leaders, defend civilian centers spread throughout the region, free civilian prisoners, and cut off the flow of drugs in order to deny the MFLC financial backing. Although the Ghosts cause massive damage to the MFLC's war efforts, the MFLC and the FARC have connections to sleeper cells holed up in democratic Cuba. Unless they are told to hold back their use of force by their commanders in Colombia, they will cause widespread damage to Cuba and its populace.

To prevent this senseless act of violence, the Ghosts assault the last major MFLC campsite in the hills, which surrounds a large radio tower. With the help of UN peacekeepers and captured personnel at the tower, the Ghosts shut down the sleeper cells in Cuba, paving the way for them to strike at the heart of the MFLC and ending their rebellion permanently. The game goes into little detail as to what happens after the MFLC are defeated, but supposedly their defeat shuts down the rebellion put up by the other rebel factions and the FARC across Colombia.

Reception

Combined sales of Jungle Storm and Tom Clancy's Ghost Recon: Island Thunder reached 1.1 million copies by the end of March 2004.

Tom Clancy's Ghost Recon: Jungle Storm received mixed reviews. It has an aggregate score of 70.36% on GameRankings and 70/100 on Metacritic. It received a runner-up placement in GameSpots 2004 "Best N-Gage Game" award category, losing to Colin McRae Rally 2005.

The game went offline in 2011.

References

External links
 

2004 video games
Multiplayer and single-player video games
Multiplayer online games
PlayStation 2 games
Red Storm Entertainment games
Tom Clancy games
Tom Clancy's Ghost Recon games
Ubisoft games
Video game expansion packs
Video games developed in the United States
Video games featuring female protagonists
Video games set in Colombia
es:Tom Clancy's Ghost Recon#Ghost Recon: Jungle Storm
gl:Tom Clancy's Ghost Recon#Ghost Recon: Jungle Storm